Khub Yaran may refer to:
 Khub Yaran-e Olya
 Khub Yaran-e Sofla